Krumë is a town and a former municipality in the Kukës County, northern Albania. At the 2015 local government reform it became a subdivision and the seat of the municipality Has. The population according to the 2011 census was 6,006. It was the seat of the former Has District.

Geography
Krumë is located at about 430 m above sea level. It is a small town at the north-west foot of the Bjeshka e Krumes mountain, from which comes a large source of underground water called Vrella with clean and cool water serving the domestic population's needs for fresh water. Maja e Gjytezës, a mountain located few kilometers south of Krumë reaches an altitude of 1435  m above sea level.

Economy
The main activities are copper mining and agriculture. The region is known for its copper mines which production is expected to dramatically increase in the coming decade. According to new government plans, tourism and copper industry will drive the economic growth of the region.

See also
Albania-Yugoslav border incident (1999)

References

Former municipalities in Kukës County
Administrative units of Has (municipality)
Towns in Albania